Pella may refer to:

Places

Greece
Pella, capital of the ancient kingdom of Macedon
Pella (regional unit), administrative unit in Macedonia, Greece
Pella (municipality), municipality in the Pella regional unit, Greece
Pella (Thessaly), town of ancient Thessaly, Greece
Pella (town), town in Macedonia, Greece, close to Pella
, a village in Macedonia, Greece, close to Pella

Ancient Near East
Pella, Jordan, ancient city in Jordan
Diocese of Pella
Apamea (Syria), called Pella during the Macedonian occupation
Pella, name of town and toparchy in Roman Judaea, usually identified with Bayt Nattif

Europe (apart from Greece)
Pella, Piedmont, municipality in the Province of Novara
Pella Palace, residence of Catherine the Great near St. Petersburg
Pella Square, a main square in Skopje, North Macedonia

Africa
Pella, Burkina Faso, city
Pella, Northern Cape, town in South Africa

America
Pella, Iowa, city in the United States
Pella, Wisconsin, town in the United States
Pella (CDP), Wisconsin, census-designated place in the town

People
Catalina Pella (born 1993), Argentine female tennis player, sister of Guido
Giuseppe Pella (18 April 1902 – 31 May 1981), Prime Minister of Italy, 1953-4
Guido Pella (born 1990), Argentine male tennis player, brother of Catalina
Vespasian Pella (4/17 January 1897 – 24 August 1960), Romanian jurist

Fictive characters
Aka Pella, a character from Histeria!

Other
Pella curse tablet, a magic spell, written in Doric Greek
Pella (company), manufacturer of windows and doors
Pella (beetle), a genus of rove beetle
JSC Leningrad Shipyard Pella, producer of the Raptor-class patrol boat

See also 
 Pela (disambiguation)